Hans-Jürgen Puhle (born 8 October 1940 in Środa Śląska) is a German historian and political scientist.

Further reading 
 , Christian Lammert, Söhnke Schreyer (editors): Staat, Nation, Demokratie. Traditionen und Perspektiven moderner Gesellschaften. Festschrift für Hans-Jürgen Puhle.Vandenhoeck & Ruprecht, Göttingen 2001, .
 Bettina Hitzer, Thomas Welskopp (editors): Die Bielefelder Sozialgeschichte. Klassische Texte zu einem geschichtswissenschaftlichen Programm und seinen Kontroversen (= Histoire. vol. 18). Transcript, Bielefeld 2010, .
 : La Ciencia Política histórica. Historiador de Alemania y politólogo en el mundo: Conversación con Hans-Jürgen Puhle. In Historia del Presente. Vol. 24, No. 2, 2014, .

References

External links 
 
 Seite von Puhle an der Universität Frankfurt am Main

1940 births
Living people
People from Środa Śląska
20th-century German historians
German political scientists
German editors
Academic staff of Goethe University Frankfurt
Academic staff of Bielefeld University
Academic staff of the University of Münster